German submarine U-533 was a Type IXC/40 U-boat of Nazi Germany's Kriegsmarine during World War II. The submarine was laid down on 17 February 1942 at the Deutsche Werft yard at Hamburg as yard number 351, launched on 11 September 1942 and commissioned on 25 November 1942 under the command of Kapitänleutnant Helmut Hennig. After training with the 4th U-boat Flotilla in the Baltic Sea, U-533 was transferred to the 10th flotilla for front-line service on 1 May 1943, and sunk in the Gulf of Oman on 16 October with one survivor.

Design
German Type IXC/40 submarines were slightly larger than the original Type IXCs. U-533 had a displacement of  when at the surface and  while submerged. She had two shafts and two  propellers.

U-533 was fitted with six  torpedo tubes (four fitted at the bow and two at the stern), 22 torpedoes, one  SK C/32 naval gun, 180 rounds, and a  SK C/30 as well as a  C/30 anti-aircraft gun. The boat had a complement of forty-eight.

Service history

First patrol
U-533 departed Kiel on 15 April 1943, and sailed out into the Atlantic, but came under repeated attack from Allied aircraft, giving it very little opportunity to cause any damage to shipping.

On 24 April U-533 was attacked by a Hudson light bomber of No. 269 Squadron RAF. The U-boat was moderately damaged by the attack, defending itself with its AA guns. The next day, 25 April, the submarine was attacked again from the air, this time by an American PBY-5A Catalina of United States Navy squadron VP-84. Three of the U-boat's gunners were injured, but the U-boat was not severely damaged. On 20 May U-533 was attacked by a Halifax heavy bomber of No. 502 Squadron RAF, without suffering any serious damage. The U-boat arrived at her new home port of Lorient in occupied France, on 24 May after 40 days at sea.

Second patrol
On 5 July 1943 the U-boat sailed from Lorient, through the Atlantic, around the Cape of Good Hope, into the Indian Ocean, and up to the mouth of the Persian Gulf.

Operating as part of the Monsun Gruppe, it was sunk in the Gulf of Oman on 16 October, in position , by depth charges dropped from a British Bisley (Blenheim) light bomber of No. 244 Squadron RAF, piloted by Lewis William Chapman. Of the crew of 53, only one survived; Matrosengefreiter Günther Schmidt, who was with an officer in the conning tower. Without escape sets, the water pressure shot both men to the surface. Schmidt kept the unconscious officer afloat for an hour before he died, and Schmidt swam and stayed afloat without a life jacket for 28 hours until he was rescued by  near Khor Fakkan. Schmidt spent the remainder of the war as a POW. Chapman received the Distinguished Flying Medal for his action.

Wreck
The U-boat slid nose-first into the sandy bottom, leaving her bow partially submerged and stern and propeller exposed.

Wolfpacks
U-533 took part in three wolfpacks, namely:
 Star (27 April –  4 May 1943) 
 Fink (4 – 6 May 1943)
 Monsun (5 July – 10 October 1943)

References

Bibliography

External links

German Type IX submarines
U-boats commissioned in 1942
U-boats sunk in 1943
U-boats sunk by depth charges
U-boats sunk by British aircraft
World War II submarines of Germany
Indian Ocean U-Boats
World War II shipwrecks in the Indian Ocean
1942 ships
Ships built in Hamburg
Maritime incidents in October 1943